Brigadier General José M. Portela (Ret.), (born June 16, 1949), is a retired officer of the United States Air Force who recently retired from the position of Assistant Adjutant General for Air, which he held while also serving as commander of the Puerto Rico Air National Guard. In 1972, Portela became the youngest C-141 Starlifter aircraft commander and captain at age 22. Portela is also the only reservist ever to serve as director of mobility forces for Bosnia. He is also the first native of Puerto Rico to hold the rank of Brigadier General in the United States Air Force Reserve.

Early years
Portela was born on June 16, 1949, and raised in San Juan, Puerto Rico, where he received his primary and secondary education. He enrolled in the University of Puerto Rico after he graduated from high school and earned a Bachelor of Arts degree in business administration in 1969 at the age of 19.

Military career
Portela joined the United States Air Force Reserves and was commissioned a Second Lieutenant through the Air Force Reserve Officer Training Corps while still 19 years of age. In June 1969 he received his undergraduate pilot training at Webb Air Force Base in Texas and earned his pilot wings in June 1970. Promoted to first lieutenant, he was assigned to the 41st Military Airlift Squadron at Charleston AFB, S.C. and flew C-141A Starlifter during which time he became the youngest C-141A aircraft commander at age 22. On June 8, 1972, he was promoted to captain and, in September 1972, served with the 3rd Military Airlift Squadron which briefly operated the new Lockheed C-5A Galaxy at Charleston Air Force Base, South Carolina. B. General Portela served at CAFB, S.C. until July 1973, when he joined the Air Force Reserves as a C-5A Initial Cadre pilot with the 312th Airlift Squadron at Travis Air Force Base, California.

He served in a variety of flying, command and staff positions from November 1982 to November 1984, during which time he was promoted to the rank of major (June 8, 1983) and served as a C-5 flight examiner, 326th Military Airlift Squadron at Dover Air Force Base in Dover, Delaware. In 1984, Portela took the Marine Command and Staff War Course and was reassigned to the 433RD Airlift Wing at Kelly Air Force Base, Texas, where he served as a C-5 standardization/evaluation chief and airlift control flight commander until June 1992, he was promoted to lieutenant colonel on June 17, 1987. During this timeframe he completed the National Security Management Course at the National Defense University.

From June 1992 to August 1995, Portela served in the following positions at Headquarters: United States Air Force in the Pentagon in Washington, D.C.p; Individual mobilization augmentee, VJ3, United States Southern Command and Latin American affairs political/military officer (XOXXW) (June 1992 -October 1992); Individual mobilization augmentee, VJ3, United States Southern Command and plans and issues officer (XOXX) (October 1992 -June 1993) and Individual mobilization augmentee to the chief, Mobility Forces Division (XOFM) (June 1993 -August 1995). He was promoted to colonel on July 1, 1992. During this time frame, Portela attended the following courses: Joint Warfare Operations Course (1993) and National Security and Decision Making, Strategy and Policy Courses (1995) at the Naval War College and the Reserve Components National Security Course (1994) at the National War College.

From August 1995 to July 2004, Portela served in the following positions: vice commander and inspector general, 512th Airlift Wing, Dover Air Force Base (1995–1998); vice commander, 22nd Air Force, (1998–2000), during which he was promoted to Brigadier General (June 30, 1999) and as mobilization assistant to the vice commander (2000–2003) at Dobbins Air Reserve Base, Georgia. He served as mobilization assistant to the undersecretary of the Air Force for Manpower and Reserve Affairs, at the Pentagon at Washington, DC. from January 2003 to July 2004 before being assigned Assistant Adjutant General for Air also serving as Commander of the Puerto Rico Air National Guard, San Juan, P.R., position in which he served from January 11, 2005, to  November 7, 2006.

As command pilot, Portela has flown the following military aircraft: T-37, T-38, C-141 and C-5, plus he has more than 5,000 flight hours to his credit. Besides the Vietnam War, he also participated in the following military operations: The Persian Gulf War, Operation Just Cause in Panama and Operation Desert Shield/Storm and has been the only reservist ever to serve as director of mobility forces for Bosnia.

Civilian occupation
Portela has flown Douglas DC-8s, Boeing 747, 737 and 727s, Airbus A319, A320, A321 and A330s, and Fokker 100s. He retired in June 2014 as an Airbus 330 check captain for U.S. Airways with over 25,000 hours. Portela, who has also served as a safety and glass cockpit expert for the Airline Pilots Association, is the recipient of the Airline Pilots Association (ALPA) Superior Airmanship Plaque, given for "demonstrating extraordinary flying skills and professionalism in the face of adversity, for safely recovering an aircraft with severe flight control problems, exemplifying the best of what a pilot can offer to those who have placed their lives in his hands." Portela, who is also a chapter founder of League of United Latin American Citizens and co-chairman of the Defense Advisory Council on Hispanic Issues, he has also been Honored numerous times by the Senate and House of Representatives of Puerto Rico for "Outstanding Achievements". Portela, currently resides in Dallas, Texas, with his family.

Military decorations and awards
Among Brigadier General Portela's many military decorations are the following:

   Air Force Distinguished Service Medal with one oak leaf cluster
   Legion of Merit with one oak leaf cluster
   Meritorious Service Medal with three oak leaf clusters
   Air Force Achievement Medal
   Joint Service Commendation Medal
   Joint Meritorious Unit Award
   Air Force Commendation Medal with two oak leaf clusters
   Combat Readiness Medal with seven oak leaf clusters
   Vietnam Service Medal with three bronze service stars
   National Defense Service Medal with oak leaf cluster
   Armed Forces Service Medal
   Humanitarian Service Medal
   Southwest Asia Service Medal with service star
   Air Force Longevity Service Award
   Armed Forces Reserve Medal
   Small Arms Expert Marksmanship Ribbon
   Air Force Training Ribbon
   Vietnam Campaign Medal
   Vietnam Cross of Gallantry with Emblem with Palm and Frame
   Kuwait Liberation Medal (Saudi Arabia) 
   Kuwait Liberation Medal (Kuwait)
Badges:
   US Air Force Command Pilot Badge
   Headquarters Air Force badge

See also

 List of Puerto Ricans
 Puerto Rico Air National Guard
 List of Puerto Rican military personnel
 Hispanics in the United States Air Force

References

Further reading
 Puertorriquenos Who Served With Guts, Glory, and Honor. Fighting to Defend a Nation Not Completely Their Own; by : Greg Boudonck; 

1949 births
Living people
Puerto Rican United States Air Force personnel
Recipients of the Legion of Merit
United States Air Force personnel of the Gulf War
United States Air Force personnel of the Vietnam War
Puerto Rican aviators
United States Air Force generals
United States Air Force reservists
Puerto Rican military officers
Naval War College alumni
Recipients of the Air Force Distinguished Service Medal
Recipients of the Distinguished Flying Cross (United States)
Recipients of the Gallantry Cross (Vietnam)
Recipients of the Meritorious Service Medal (United States)
University of Puerto Rico alumni
Puerto Rico National Guard personnel